The 10th Indian Division was an infantry division of the British Indian Army during World War I.  It was formed in Egypt in December 1914 with three infantry brigades of Indian Expeditionary Force F.  After taking part in the Actions on the Suez Canal, the division was dispersed as its brigades were posted away.

It was re-formed in January 1916 as part of the Suez Canal Defences with units and formations in Egypt, but this was short-lived.  It was broken up again on 7 March 1916 as the need to re-form depleted units from France made this plan unrealistic.

The division was commanded throughout its existence by Major-General Alexander Wilson.

History

First formation
The 28th, 29th and 30th Indian Brigades were formed in October 1914 and posted to Egypt as Indian Expeditionary Force F. The 10th Indian Division was formed on 24 December 1915 with these three brigades, and little else in terms of divisional troops.  The division had beat off Turkish attempts to cross the Suez Canal on 3–4 February 1915 in the Actions on the Suez Canal.

Thereafter, the division was soon dissolved with a brigade (30th) sent to Mesopotamia in March 1915, another (29th) detached to Gallipoli from April to December 1915, and the third (28th) detached to Aden from July to September 1915, before it also departed for Mesopotamia in November.

Order of Battle, January 1915
The division commanded the following units in January 1915:
28th Indian Brigade (Major-General Sir G. Younghusband)
51st Sikhs (Frontier Force)
53rd Sikhs (Frontier Force)
56th Punjabi Rifles (Frontier Force)
1/5th Gurkha Rifles
29th Indian Brigade (Brigadier-General H.V. Cox)
14th King George's Own Ferozepore Sikhs
69th Punjabis
89th Punjabis
1/6th Gurkha Rifles
30th Indian Brigade (Major-General C.J. Melliss)
24th Punjabis
76th Punjabis
126th Baluchistan Infantry
2/7th Gurkha Rifles
Divisional troops
VII Mountain Brigade, IMA
21st Kohat Mountain Battery (Frontier Force)
26th Jacob's Mountain Battery
Field Ambulances
105th Indian Field Ambulance
108th Indian Field Ambulance
123rd Indian Field Ambulance
135th Indian Field Ambulance

Re-formed
The division was re-formed on 7 January 1916 as part of the Suez Canal Defences with units and formations in Egypt: 20th Indian Brigade joined from 7th (Meerut) Division, 29th Indian Brigade rejoined from Gallipoli and 31st Indian Brigade joined from 11th Indian Division.  The new division was short-lived: it was broken up again on 7 March 1916 as the need to re-form depleted units from France made this plan unrealistic.

Order of Battle, January 1916
The division commanded the following units in January 1916:
20th Indian Brigade (Brigadier-General H.D. Watson)
2/2nd Gurkha Rifles
2/3rd Gurkha Rifles
39th Garhwal Rifles
4th Gwalior Infantry (I.S.)
29th Indian Brigade (Brigadier-General P.C. Palin)
14th King George's Own Ferozepore Sikhs
57th Wilde's Rifles (Frontier Force)
1/5th Gurkha Rifles
1/6th Gurkha Rifles
31st Indian Brigade (Brigadier-General A.H. Bingley)
58th Vaughan's Rifles (Frontier Force)
1/4th Gurkha Rifles
2/8th Gurkha Rifles
1st Patiala Infantry (I.S.)
Divisional Troops
Unbridaged
33rd Punjabis
2/10th Gurkha Rifles
Alwar Infantry (I.S.)
Mounted Troops
Mysore Lancers (I.S.)
Patiala Lancers (I.S.)
Hyderabad Lancers (I.S.)
Bikaner Camel Corps (I.S.)
Artillery
Hong Kong and Singapore Royal Artillery Battery
Engineers
10th Company, 2nd Queen's Own Sappers and Miners
Pioneers
23rd Sikh Pioneers
Field Ambulances
105th Indian Field Ambulance
108th Indian Field Ambulance
123rd Indian Field Ambulance
135th Indian Field Ambulance

See also

 List of Indian divisions in World War I

Notes

References

Bibliography

External links

British Indian Army divisions
Indian World War I divisions
Military units and formations established in 1914
Military units and formations disestablished in 1916